The 1950–51 season was the 48th season of competitive football in Belgium. RSC Anderlechtois won their 4th and 3rd consecutive Premier Division title
The Belgium national football team played 6 friendly games, with 1 win, 3 draws and 2 losses.

Overview
At the end of the season, Beringen FC and RFC Brugeois were relegated to Division I, while RU Saint-Gilloise (Division I A winner) and RUS Tournaisienne (Division I B winner) were promoted to the Premier Division.
RU Hutoise FC, EFC Hasselt, SC Eendracht Aalst and K Tubantia FC were relegated from Division I to Promotion, to be replaced by Daring Club Leuven, RRC de Gand, Waterschei SV Thor and Rupel SK.

National team

* Belgium score given first

Key
 H = Home match
 A = Away match
 N = On neutral ground
 F = Friendly
 o.g. = own goal

Honours

Final league tables

Premier Division

Top scorer: Albert De Hert (R Berchem Sport) with 27 goals.

References